XHPBQR-TDT is a television station on virtual channel 24 (physical channel 11) in Querétaro, Querétaro. It is the television station of the Universidad Autónoma de Querétaro and transmits from the SPR tower on Cerro El Cimatario.

History
XHPBQR was awarded to the university in March 2017 and began testing on December 1, with full programming beginning on the 11th of the month. It currently broadcasts from 7am to 12am daily.

Programming is planned to include newscasts covering university events, as well as programs produced by the university's academic units, learning and teaching programs.

References

HPBQR-TDT
Television channels and stations established in 2017
2017 establishments in Mexico
Public television in Mexico
Autonomous University of Queretaro